Crotalocephalus is a genus of trilobites that lived from the Late Silurian to the Early Devonian. Its remains have been found in Asia, Australia, Africa, and Europe.

References

External links

Crotalocephalus in the Paleobiology Database

Plovdiv Museum of Natural History - Fossil exhibition - Crotalocephalus.jpg

Cheiruridae
Phacopida genera
Silurian trilobites
Devonian trilobites
Paleozoic animals of Asia
Trilobites of Oceania
Trilobites of Europe
Ludlow first appearances
Early Devonian genus extinctions